Kaposi's disease can refer to:
 Kaposi's sarcoma
 Lichen ruber moniliformis